Hindalgi is a census town in Belgaum district in the Indian state of Karnataka.
Very small place

Demographics 
 India census, Hindalgi had a population of 12,864. Males constitute 54% of the population and females 46%. Hindalgi has an average literacy rate of 79%, higher than the national average of 59.5%: male literacy is 82%, and female literacy is 76%. In Hindalgi, 11% of the population is under 6 years of age.

References 

Cities and towns in Belagavi district